Stephen Tan (born in 1961), is a Hong Kong businessman. He is the first son of Robin Chan (chairman of the Asia Financial Group), and a grandson of Chin Sophonpanich (founder and former president of Bangkok Bank). He serves as the executive director of the Asia Financial Group. He has a brother Bernard Chan, who is a Hong Kong politician and businessman, president of Asia Financial Group and its main subsidiary, Asia Insurance.

References

External links
Stephen Tan & Bernard Chan
Biography Stephen Tan

1961 births
Living people
Stephen Tan
Hong Kong people of Thai descent
Stephen Tan 
Members of the Election Committee of Hong Kong, 2007–2012
Members of the Election Committee of Hong Kong, 2012–2017
Hong Kong businesspeople